Petr Šilar (born 16 May 1956) is a Czech politician who has been Senator from Ústí nad Orlicí since October 2010. Since November 2012 he is a chairman of the Christian and Democratic Union – Czechoslovak People's Party Senate Club and member of presidency of the party.

References

1956 births
Living people
KDU-ČSL Senators
People from Ústí nad Orlicí District
Czech University of Life Sciences Prague alumni